LIVE365 is an Internet radio network where users are able to create their own online radio stations and listen to thousands of human curated stations. Online radio stations on the Live365 network were created and managed by music and talk enthusiasts, including both hobbyists and professional broadcasters. Live365 also has many well established AM and FM stations that use Live365 broadcasting platform to simulcast their terrestrial radio streams. The Live365 network also features radio stations from artists such as Johnny Cash, David Byrne, Pat Metheny, Jethro Tull, and Frank Zappa. Live365 was created in 1999, and remains one of the longest running internet radio websites for listeners and broadcasters.

This internet radio provides service in the United States, Canada, and the United Kingdom, with licenses from those countries' performance rights societies.

History 
Nanocosm Inc. (the parent company of Live365) was a technology startup founded by two roommates from the Princeton class of 1981, Alex Sanford and Steve Follmer, whose initial product was NanoHome, a 3D "Virtual Home" website featuring 3D homepages on the World Wide Web.

Live365 had its beginnings in a hosted community radio project developed by Nanocosm employee Andy Volk in his free time using Shoutcast technology, and later modified by employee Brian Lomeland. In 1998, Andy Volk shared the idea with Nanocosm CTO Peter Rothman, and they developed the concept for a new large-scale hosted community radio service dubbed Live365. After launch in July 1999, Live365 quickly eclipsed NanoHome, and the company soon shifted to solely focus on Live365 and online audio streaming services.

At launch, broadcasting and listening on Live365 was free of charge. Stations had a maximum listener cap of 365 simultaneous listeners and 365 megabytes of storage for music and audio. In September 2001, Live365 began charging for use of its broadcasting services to remain financially viable in the wake of rising music royalty costs. More expensive plans allowed stations to have more simultaneous listeners and a greater amount of music file storage space. Members who joined before September 2001 could continue broadcasting with their original package for free. This model would later be replaced with one in which all members pay, but those who joined before September 2001 received a discount. In March 2003, Live365 launched their commercial-free membership called VIP.

Closure and reopening
The Webcaster Settlement Act of 2009 expired in January 2016, ending a 10-year period in which smaller online radio stations, Live365 among them, paid lower music licensing fees compared to larger broadcasters. After this time, smaller radio stations were required to pay the same fees as the largest broadcasters. Also, on January 31, 2016, webcasters, who are governed by rules adopted by the Copyright Royalty Board, were required to begin paying SoundExchange an annual, nonrefundable minimum fee of $500 for each channel and station, the fee for services with greater than 100 stations or channels being $50,000 annual. 

With the pending expiration of the lower royalty rate allowed for small broadcasters, investors removed their support of the company. In late December 2015, Live365 laid off most of its employees and vacated its office, and the few remaining employees were remote workers. On January 31, 2016, Live365 ceased webcasting and its website redirected listeners and users to a list of competing services. A year after its closure, Live365 relaunched its site and streaming services.

In July 2016, Live365 was acquired by Jon Stephenson, owner of content delivery network EmpireStreaming (now SoundStack). The following month, the website returned with signs of a possible relaunch. An article was posted to the site's official Twitter on May 23, 2017 announcing the relaunch.

On January 6, 2018, Live365 was reorganized under Media Creek Inc., a Delaware-based holding company.

Services and features

Listening 
Live365 offers a variety of music and talk from numerous countries and genres. Users may listen to thousands of stations on the Live365 radio network for free, with in-stream audio ads covering a portion of the music royalty and streaming costs. Live365 also offers personalized recommendations. Live365 is available for listening on the web and across many mobile and home streaming devices.

Live365 offers a paid listener subscription service called VIP, which features commercial-free listening.

Broadcasting platform 

Live365 broadcast continuously from 1999 until January 31, 2016 and revival in 2018. Users can host their own live broadcast or they can upload and build playlists of music and talk content and to stream.

Live365 is an officially licensed ASCAP, BMI and SESAC site. Live365 pays music royalties to labels, artists, songwriters, and publishers through organizations including ASCAP, BMI, SESAC, and SoundExchange.

In October 2011, Live365 created the Pro Points rewards program allowing Pro broadcasters to carry Live365 audio ads and earn $1,000 each time an ad milestone is reached.

In 2013, Live365 released a mobile app for broadcasters called Studio365 for Mobile, where Live365 broadcasters can manage their radio station.

Company milestones 
 July 1999: Developed originally as a virtual home environment named Nanohome, Live365 was created as a side project to create a form of online community radio.  After popular public demand, focus shifted to developing Live365 full-time. 
 October 1999: Basic mode broadcasting technology released to broadcasters. Technology noted as first of its kind for streaming internet broadcasts.  
 November 1999: Live365 makes the cover of Billboard magazine
 2001: New broadcasters’ packages upgraded, allowing for more storage space and simultaneous listeners.  Previous limited space included 365 MB for storage and 365 simultaneous listeners.  
 2002: Royalty rights continue to climb for internet radio services.  Live365 fights back by airing public service announcements about increasing royalty rates on their stations.
 March 2003: Launches ad-free VIP membership service (originally called Preferred Membership)
 November 2003: Releases Radio365 – desktop player for Mac  
 March 2004: Releases Radio365 – desktop player for Windows
 August 2005: Launches on TiVo streaming devices
 June 2007: Copyright Royalty Board hearings in Washington, D.C.  Live365 joins other internet radio companies in opposing higher music royalty rates. 
 November 2007: Windows mobile app released
 April 2009: Mobile app for iPhone released. 
 July 2010: Website redesign with an updated logo design.  The new design includes an embedded audio player that’s accessible from every page of the website.  The player features album art, recommendations, and sharing features including Facebook, Twitter, Presets, and improved station search.
 November 16, 2010: Releases two new targeted websites:  The female centric Athena365, and MyGen365, an internet radio site dedicated to baby boomers.  
 April 7, 2011: Next generation of Live365 Radio iPhone app released
 June 28, 2011: Mobile app for Android devices released
 September 2011: Begins streaming on Roku devices
 October 2011: Launches Pro Points program paying Professional Broadcasters for reaching certain milestones
 December 2011: Live365 app released on Amazon Kindle Fire devices
 April 2012: Releases multi-platform desktop player called Live365 Desktop
 August 2012: Launches dedicated iPad app
 March 2013: Launches Studio365 mobile app
 January 31, 2016:  Operations terminated due to imposition of higher royalty rates
 July 2016:  Temporary suspends operations
 January 2017: Live 365 resumes operations.

References

External links 
 

Internet radio stations in the United States
Internet properties established in 1999
Companies based in Foster City, California
1999 establishments in California